The Lexington Men O' War were a minor league professional ice hockey team and member of the ECHL.  The name Man o' War is from a thoroughbred race horse that was bred in Lexington, and also the name of a highly traveled road in Lexington. The Men O' War played at Rupp Arena in Lexington, Kentucky from 2002 to 2003.

They finished with a record of 34-31-7 and 75 points, which placed them fourth in the Northwest Division. However, they only brought in an average of 2,368 fans per game, the fourth-fewest in the league. The team drew the Toledo Storm in the first round of the playoffs that year, and were swept in three games (1–9, 0–3, 1–5). Van Burgess led the team in points with 55, while Mark Smith paced the team with 22 goals. Jay Banach paced the team with 191 penalty minutes. Dan Murphy played a team high 43 games in net, and won 21.

The team folded following the 2002–03 season, and would later be revived as the Utah Grizzlies beginning in the 2005–06 season.

Season-by-season results

References

External links
Lexington Men O' War Statistics

Defunct ECHL teams
Men O' War
Ice hockey teams in Kentucky
Defunct ice hockey teams in the United States
Ice hockey clubs established in 2002
Ice hockey clubs disestablished in 2003
2002 establishments in Kentucky
2003 disestablishments in Kentucky